The Balembouche River is a coastal river in Laborie Quarter, Saint Lucia that flows into the Caribbean Sea.

See also
List of rivers of Saint Lucia
Balembouche (plantation, populated place, bay)

References

Rivers of Saint Lucia